Play by ear  may refer to:

Improvisation, the act of inventing all or part of a process as it is performed.
Learning music by ear, learning how to play a musical piece purely by listening to a rendition of the piece alone, without the aid of printed material